John Houston is the name of:

Sir John Houston, 2nd Baronet, of that Ilk, was Commissioner for Stirlingshire and for Renfrewshire
Sir John Houston, 3rd Baronet (died 1722), his son, MP for Linlithgowshire
John Houston (immigrant) (1690–1754), Scottish-Irish immigrant to Colonial America, great grandfather of Sam Houston
John Houston (doctor) (1802–1845), Irish-British doctor
John Houston (New Zealand writer) (1891–1962), New Zealand historian and writer
John Houston (newspaperman) (1850–1910), Pioneer newspaperman and politician from British Columbia, Canada
John Houston (painter) (1930–2008), Scottish painter
John Houston (skier), Canadian para-alpine skier
John A. Houston (born 1952), U.S. federal judge 
John Caroll Houston IV (1842–1918), settler and three-term mayor of Eau Gallie, Florida
John Mills Houston (1890–1975), U.S. Representative from Kansas
John W. Houston (1814–1896), U.S. Representative from Delaware
John Houston (rugby union) (born 1983), Scottish professional rugby centre or wing, also plays sevens for Scotland

See also
John Huston (disambiguation)